Self-Portrait with a Blue Sketchbook is a 1907 watercolour painting by Belgian artist Léon Spilliaert. It is part of a series of ten self-portraits produced by him between 1907 and 1908. It has been in the collection of the Royal Museum of Fine Arts, Antwerp since 1950.

References

Self-portraits
Portraits of men
1907 paintings
Watercolor paintings
Belgian paintings
Paintings in the collection of the Royal Museum of Fine Arts Antwerp
1900s paintings
Symbolist paintings
Books in art